Component video requires an extra synchronization signal to be sent along with the video. Component video sync signals can be sent in several different ways:

Separate sync Uses separate wires for horizontal and vertical synchronization. When used in RGB (i.e. VGA) connections, five separate signals are sent (Red, Green, Blue, Horz. Sync, Vert. Sync).
Composite sync Combines horizontal and vertical synchronization onto one pair of wires. When used in RGB connections, four separate signals are sent (Red, Green, Blue, Sync).
Sync-on-green (SOG) Combines composite sync with the green signal in RGB. Only three signals are sent (Red, Green with Sync, Blue). This synchronization system is used in - among other applications - many systems by Silicon Graphics and Sun Microsystems through a DB13W3 connector.
Sync-on-luminance Similar to sync-on-green, but combines sync with the luminance signal (Y) of a color system such as YPbPr and S-Video. This is the synchronization system normally used in home theater systems.
Sync-on-composite The connector carries a standard composite video signal along with the RGB components, for use with devices that cannot process RGB signals. For devices that do understand RGB, the sync component of that composite signal is used along with the color information from the RGB lines. This arrangement is found in the SCART connector in common use in Europe and some other PAL/SECAM areas.

See also
Composite video - can be contrasted with component video
Vertical sync
SCART

External links
 VGA to Sync-On-Green adapter — circuit to convert VGA sync to sync-on-green.

Video signal